An androlla is a Galician embutido made from pork. It is similar to the botillo sausages of León.

It is prepared from the "cueras" (the end of a slab of bacon).  Cueras are well cleaned, without the skin; rib meat is added with portions of the diaphragm muscles. It is eaten cooked and is often accompanied by "cachelos" (boiled potatoes).

In the regions of León and Zamora, the word "androlla" can refer to any kind of pork sausage.

Spanish sausages